The 2016 Africa Cup was the sixteenth edition of the Africa Cup, an annual international rugby union competition for African nations organised by Rugby Africa.

The competition was split into four divisions – Division 1A, Division 1B, Division 1C and Division 2, with promotion and relegation between the divisions.

Divisions

Division 1A

The 2016 Africa Cup Division 1A was decided on a round-robin format. The matches was played between 2 July and 6 August 2016. The log leader after the round-robin matches was crowned the Division 1A champions, while the team ranked last was relegated to Division 1B for 2017.

Teams

The following teams took part in the 2016 Africa Cup Division 1A:

Uganda were promoted from the 2015 Africa Cup Division 1B.

Standings

The final log for the 2016 Africa Cup Division 1A were:

Matches

The following matches were played in the 2016 Africa Cup Division 1A:

Division 1B

The 2016 Africa Cup Division 1B consisted of two round-robin tournaments, with the winners of each tournament playing each other in the final. The six teams were divided into two pools, with three teams in each pool. The pool winners met in the final on 16 July 2016, with the winner of that match earning promotion to Division 1A. The team ranked last was relegated to Division 1C for 2017.

Teams

The following teams took part in the 2016 Africa Cup Division 1B:

Tunisia were relegated from the 2015 Africa Cup Division 1A, while Zambia were promoted from the 2015 Africa Cup Division 1C.

Standings

The final log for the 2016 Africa Cup Division 1B were:

Matches

Pool A

Pool B

Final

Division 1C

The matches of Division 1C was played between 10 and 16 July 2016 at Stade du C.O.C. in Casablanca, Morocco. Cameroon was originally scheduled to compete, but withdrew due to internal problems with the union

This division also doubles as the first qualification phase for the 2019 Rugby World Cup. The winner of 2016 Africa Cup Division 1C will win promotion to the 2017 Africa Cup Division 1B, the second phase of the Rugby World Cup qualification process.

Teams

The following teams took part in the 2016 Africa Cup Division 1C:

Morocco remained in Division 1C despite not playing in the 2015 Africa Cup, while Mauritius were relegated from the 2015 Africa Cup Division 1B.

Matches

Division 2

The 2016 Africa Cup Division 2 was split into two regions. In the East region,  and  played in a tournament in Kigali, Rwanda between 17 and 20 May 2016. In the West region,  and  played in a rugby sevens tournament in Lomé, Togo on 27 May 2016.

Teams

The following teams took part in the 2016 Africa Cup Division 2:

Congo, Lesotho, Malawi and Swaziland were not included in the 2016 Africa Cup.

Matches

East

Lesotho were originally schedule to play in the semi-finals against DR Congo, but travel delays caused them to miss the first round, forfeiting the match.

Semi-finals

3rd Place Finals

Final

West

Round-Robin

Semi-finals

5th Place Playoff

3rd Place Playoff

Final

See also

 Africa Cup

References

External links
 

2016
2016 rugby union tournaments for national teams
2016 in African rugby union